WKLX (100.7 FM) is a classic hits–formatted radio station licensed to Brownsville, Kentucky, United States, and serving the Bowling Green media market. The station is currently owned by Charles M. Anderson's Commonwealth Broadcasting as part of a triopoly with Plum Springs–licensed sports radio station WWKU (1450 AM) and Horse Cave–licensed adult contemporary station WOVO (106.3 FM). The station's transmitter is located along Kentucky Route 1749 near the Wingfield community of southwestern Edmonson County; it was the only broadcasting station transmitting from that tower until Spring 2014, when it began sharing tower space with low-powered television station WCZU-LD.

In addition to its primary signal covering the greater Bowling Green area, WKLX operates a satellite station: WWKN (99.1 FM). Licensed to Morgantown, Kentucky, that station's transmitter is located on Veterans Way (KY 70 on the west side of town.

History
The station signed on the air as WAUE on June 1, 1997. It switched to its current WKLX callsign on July 10, 1998, which is about 11 months and 9 days after its inception. It started broadcasting as an adult hits station using the branding 100.7 KLX. It was branded as Star 100.7 during the mid-2000s. The current 100.7 Sam FM moniker was adopted in 2006.  Along the way after changing their branding to Sam FM, the format changed formats to classic hits.

WWKN began as a construction permit in 2008, although it would not go on-the-air until 2011. Since its launch, it has served as a full-time satellite of WKLX.

Programming
The station is the flagship station of Western Kentucky Hilltoppers basketball broadcasts from the Hilltopper Sports Network. WKLX, along with Plum Springs-licensed WWKU are co-flagships for that network's coverage of the university's football games.

References

External links

KLX
Radio stations established in 1997